Datian (Mandarin: 大田镇) is a town in Renhe District, Panzhihua, Sichuan, China. In 2010, Datian had a total population of 7,999: 4,086 males and 3,913 females: 1,236 aged under 14, 5,871 aged between 15 and 65 and 892 aged over 65.

See also 
 List of township-level divisions of Sichuan

References 

Panzhihua
Towns in Sichuan